The statue of Florence Nightingale is an outdoor Grade II-listed sculpture in London, United Kingdom. It was sculpted in 1915 by Arthur George Walker, and is a subsidiary part of the Guards Crimean War Memorial.

See also
 Statue of Sidney Herbert, London

References

External links
 

Cultural depictions of Florence Nightingale
Nightingale, Florence
Monuments and memorials in London
Nightingale
Nightingale
Nightingale